George Frederick Folingsby (23 August 1828 – 4 January 1891) was an Irish-born Australian painter and art educator.

Folingsby was born in the County of Wicklow, Ireland. At the age of 18 he emigrated to Canada. Later he went to New York Cit studied drawing and contributed illustrations to magazines of the day, including Harper's Magazine. In 1852 he went to Munich and spent two years at the drawing school of the Royal Academy. He then went to Paris and for a few months was a pupil of Thomas Couture. Returning to Munich he worked for five years under Carl von Piloty.

In 1864, Folingsby's picture Bunyan in prison, was purchased by the National Gallery of Victoria. He continued to live in Munich but occasionally exhibited in Ireland and England; his The first lesson was hung in the Royal Academy in 1869 and Lady Jane's victory over Bishop Gardener in 1871. He was awarded medals for historical paintings at the exhibitions held at Vienna in 1871 and Philadelphia in 1873. 

Folingsby arrived in Melbourne, Australia with his ten-year-old daughter, on 1 July 1879.  His reputation as a figure painter preceded him and he was quickly sought after as a portraitist, making a living from commissions of eminent members of Melbourne society.  Folingsby was offered the position of Master in the School of Painting at the gallery and was appointed on 1 June 1882. 

In September of that year, he was appointed as the first Director of the National Gallery of Victoria and reorganized the painting school. The practice of making copies of pictures ceased and every encouragement was given to working from life. 

Among his pupils were John Longstaff and Aby Altson, the winners of the first and second travelling scholarships, and Iso Rae.

After the death of Folingsby, Lindsay Bernard Hall was appointed Director of the National Gallery of Victoria.

References

External links

1828 births
1891 deaths
Australian people of Irish descent
Australian people of Anglo-Irish descent
19th-century Australian artists